Seynabou Benga Samba (born 24 November 1996) is a Senegalese footballer who plays as a defender for TPS.

Career

Club
On 6 July 2019, Benga signed for Seinäjoen Jalkapallokerho from Ekenäs IF. He left the club on 13 November 2020.

Career statistics

Club

References

1996 births
Living people
Senegalese footballers
Senegalese expatriate footballers
Association football defenders
FC UTA Arad players
Ekenäs IF players
Seinäjoen Jalkapallokerho players
Senegalese expatriate sportspeople in Italy
Expatriate footballers in Italy
Senegalese expatriate sportspeople in Romania
Expatriate footballers in Romania
Senegalese expatriate sportspeople in Finland
Expatriate footballers in Finland
SJK Akatemia players
Serie C players
Liga II players
Kakkonen players
Ykkönen players
Veikkausliiga players
Turun Palloseura footballers
F.C. Ponsacco 1920 S.S.D. players
U.S.D. Lavagnese 1919 players
Serie D players